Ramon Rodriguez is a former mayor of Lynwood, California.

Rodriguez was elected to the Lynwood City Council in 2001. In 2003, eight members of his family were charged with voter fraud after registering at a fictitious address to vote for his re-election. In December 2004, he was appointed mayor by the City Council. In the December 2005 election he lost re-election to the City Council. He was re-elected to the council in 2007 after a recall election in September 2007 where mayor Louis Byrd and council members Fernando Pedroza, Leticia Vasquez, and Alfreddie Johnson Jr were all removed from office.

Rodriguez was born in the town of Valparaíso, Zacatecas, Mexico. His family migrated to the United States in 1964, and he grew up in Hawaiian Gardens, California, where he graduated from Artesia High School in Lakewood, California. He owns an Ace Hardware store in Lynwood on Atlantic Avenue and is married to his wife Guadalupe; they have three sons and a daughter.

References

External links
Official Lynwood website profile

Living people
American politicians of Mexican descent
Hispanic and Latino American mayors in California
Mayors of places in California
Mexican emigrants to the United States
People from Lynwood, California
Year of birth missing (living people)
Mayors of Lynwood, California